Melancthon is a rural Canadian township in the northwest corner of Dufferin County, Ontario, bordered on the east by Mulmur Township, Amaranth Township and East Luther Grand Valley to the south, Southgate Township to the west, and the Municipality of Grey Highlands to the north. The township does not include the town of Shelburne on its southern border. It has one of the lowest population densities in southwestern Ontario.

The primary industry of the township is farming, with limited beef, dairy, sheep and horse farming. It is also home to the Melancthon EcoPower Centre wind farm.

The township was founded in 1853 as a part of Grey County and transferred to Dufferin County in 1881. Township council currently comprises Mayor Darren White, a deputy mayor and three councillors.

Communities
The township of Melancthon comprises a number of villages and hamlets, including the following communities: Auguston, Corbetton, Horning's Mills, Masonville, Mayburne, Melancthon, Ostrander, Redickville, Riverview, Shrigley, and Wrigglesworth Corner.

Demographics 

See also
List of townships in Ontario

References

External links

Lower-tier municipalities in Ontario
Municipalities in Dufferin County
Township municipalities in Ontario